Emticicia fontis  is a bacterium from the genus of Emticicia which has been isolated from a freshwater pond.

References

External links
Type strain of Emticicia fontis at BacDive -  the Bacterial Diversity Metadatabase

Cytophagia
Bacteria described in 2016